The  is an award given to the best animated feature film at the Mainichi Film Awards. The award was established to reward large scale cinematic animation, enabling the Ōfuji Noburō Award to focus on shorter pieces.

Winners

See also
 List of animation awards

References

Awards for best animated feature film
Anime awards
Awards established in 1989
1989 establishments in Japan
Animation Film
Lists of films by award
Lists of anime films